The Netherlands Reformed Church may refer to three distinct Christian denominations:

 Dutch Reformed Church
 Netherlands Reformed Churches
 Netherlands Reformed Congregations